Mirman Mirimanidze, better known as Safiqoli Khan (died 1631), was a Safavid official and gholam who served during the reigns of Abbas I (1588-1629) and Safi (1629-1642).

Biography
Safiqoli's original name was Mirman, and he was a member of the Mirimanidze clan. His father was named Malek Qorkhmaz, and he had a brother named Malek Atabek (Atabegi). One of his uncles, Tahmaspqoli, who was bestowed with the title Anīs ol-Dowleh, was the first influential gholam from the family. 

Safiqoli rose steadily through the Safavid ranks to become a yuzbashi (officer) early on in his career. Later on, in 1618–1619, he became prefect (darugha) of New Julfa in Isfahan, and was made governor (beglarbeg) of Hamadan shortly after, in 1619–1620. Following king Abbas I's recapture of Baghdad in 1624 during the Ottoman-Safavid War of 1623–1639, which ended many decades of Ottoman rule, Safiqoli was appointed as its new beglarbeg. In addition, he was made the local qurchi-bashi of the shrine city of Najaf. 

His two close relatives included Mihrab Khan (d. 1648/49) and Manuchehr (sometime beglarbeg of Shirvan).

References

Sources 

  
 
 
 

Year of birth unknown
1631 deaths
Safiqoli
Iranian people of Georgian descent
Persian Armenians
Safavid governors of Baghdad
Safavid military officers
Safavid governors of Hamadan
Safavid prefects of New Julfa
Nobility of Georgia (country)
Shia Muslims from Georgia (country)
Ethnic Armenian Shia Muslims
17th-century people of Safavid Iran
Safavid ghilman